The Mark 84 or BLU-117  is an American general-purpose bomb. It is the largest of the Mark 80 series of weapons. Entering service during the Vietnam War, it became a commonly used US heavy unguided bomb (due to the amount of high-explosive content packed inside) to be dropped. At the time, it was the third largest bomb by weight in the US inventory behind the  BLU-82 "Daisy Cutter" and the   M118 "demolition" bomb. It is currently sixth in size due to the addition of the  GBU-28 in 1991, the  GBU-43/B Massive Ordnance Air Blast bomb (MOAB) in 2003, and the  Massive Ordnance Penetrator.

Development 

Many Mark 84s have been retrofitted with stabilizing and retarding devices to provide precision guidance capabilities. They serve as the warhead of a variety of precision-guided munitions, including the GBU-10/GBU-24/GBU-27 Paveway laser-guided bombs, GBU-15 electro-optical bomb, GBU-31 JDAM and Quickstrike sea mines. The HGK is a Turkish guidance kit used to convert 2000-lb Mark 84 bombs into GPS/INS guided smart bombs.

According to a test report conducted by the United States Navy's Weapon System Explosives Safety Review Board (WSESRB) established in the wake of the 1967 USS Forrestal fire, the cooking off time for a Mk 84 is approximately 8 minutes 40 seconds.

See also 
 BLU-109 bomb
 BLU-116
 Mark 81 bomb
 Mark 82 bomb
 Mark 83 bomb

References

External links 
 Mk65 Quick Strike Mine
 Mk84 General Purpose Bomb

Cold War aerial bombs of the United States
Aerial bombs of the United States
Military equipment introduced in the 1970s